John Herbert "Herbie" Moran (February 16, 1884 – September 21, 1954) was an American professional baseball outfielder. He played in Major League Baseball (MLB) for the Philadelphia Athletics, Boston Doves, Brooklyn Dodgers, Cincinnati Reds, and Boston Braves between 1908 and 1915.

In 1914, Moran was a member of the Braves team that went from last place to first place in two months, becoming the first team to win a pennant after being in last place on the Fourth of July. The team then went on to defeat Connie Mack's heavily favored Philadelphia Athletics in the 1914 World Series.

References

External links

1884 births
1954 deaths
Major League Baseball outfielders
Baseball players from Pennsylvania
Philadelphia Athletics players
Boston Braves players
Boston Doves players
Brooklyn Dodgers players
Cincinnati Reds players
Coudersport Giants players
DuBois Miners players
Trenton Tigers players
Providence Grays (minor league) players
Rochester Bronchos players
Montreal Royals players
Little Rock Travelers players
People from Clarkson, New York